Emil Nowakowski (born 15 May 1974 in Lubin, Poland) is a Polish former football midfielder  who has played primarily in the Polish lower divisions.  However, he has spent time in the Polish first division and with teams in the United States, Italy, Greece and Germany.  He currently plays for FC Oberlausitz Neugersdorf in Germany.

In 1992, Nowakowski signed with Zagłębie Lubin.  In 1993, he began the season with Lubin, spent a few games with Górnik Polkowice then finished the season with Chrobry Glogow.  He remained with Glogow through the 1995-1996 season, then moved to the United States where he played the 1996 and 1997 seasons with the Central Jersey Riptide in the USISL.  In autumn 1997 he moved to Italy where he signed with Serie D club F.C. Matera.  At some point in the season, he returned to Poland to join Gornik Walbrzych.  In 1998, he began the season with Śląsk Wrocław of the Polish First League and ended it with Zagłębie Lubin.  He was back with Śląsk Wrocław for the 1999-2000 season.  In autumn 2000 he moved to Górnik Polkowice.  After two seasons, he transferred to Polonia Warsaw of the Polish top division.  In 2004, he was sent to the Polonia second team.  He then moved to newly formed Greek club ASK Olympiakos Volos F.C. from 2004 to 2007.  In 2007, he transferred to MAS Pierikos Katerini.  In 2008, he joined Fostiras Ovryas FC of the amateur Achaea Football Clubs Association.  He currently plays for FC Oberlausitz Neugersdorf in Germany.

External links
 

1974 births
Living people
Polish footballers
Zagłębie Lubin players
Górnik Polkowice players
USISL players
Central Jersey Riptide players
Śląsk Wrocław players
Polonia Warsaw players
Olympiacos Volos F.C. players
F.C. Matera players
People from Lubin
Sportspeople from Lower Silesian Voivodeship
Association football midfielders
FC Oberlausitz Neugersdorf players